2-Chloropyridine is an organohalide with the formula C5H4ClN. It is a colorless liquid that is mainly used to generate fungicides and insecticides in industry.  It also serves to generate antihistamines and antiarrythymics for pharmaceutical purposes.

Preparation 

2-Choropyridine is produced by direct reaction of pyridine with chlorine.  The initially formed 2-chloropyridine reacts further to give 2,6-dichloropyridine.

Alternatively, 2-chloropyridines can be conveniently synthesized in high yields from pyridine-N-oxides.

2-Choropyridine was originally prepared by the chlorination of 2-hydroxypyridine with phosphoryl chloride.

Main reactions and applications 
2-Chloropyridine reacts with nucleophiles to generate pyridine derivatives substituted at the second and fourth carbons on the heterocycle.  Therefore, many reactions using 2-chloropyridine generate mixtures of products which require further workup to isolate the desired isomer.

Some commercial products include pyrithione, pyripropoxyfen, chlorphenamine, and disopyramide.  In these conversions, chloride is displaced.  Pyrithione, the conjugate base of 2-mercaptopyridine-N-oxide, is a fungicide found in some shampoos.  Oxidation 2-chloropyridine gives 2-chloropyridine-N-oxide.  The antihistamine pheniramine may be generated via the reaction of phenylacetonitrile with 2-chloropyridine in the presence of a base.

Environmental properties
Although pyridine is an excellent source of carbon, nitrogen, and energy for certain microorganisms, introduction of a halogen moiety significantly retards degradation of the pyridine ring.  With the exception of 4-chloropyridine, each of the mono- and di-substituted chloropyridines were found to be relatively resistant to microbiological degradation in soil or liquid media.  Estimated time for complete degradation was > 30 days.  2-Chloropyridine exhibits extensive volatilization losses from water, less so when present in soil.

Toxicity
The LD50 is 64 mg/kg (dermal, rabbit).

References 

Chloropyridines
2-Pyridyl compounds